Sinha is a Sanskrit term which originates in the Indian subcontinent and is common in India, Sri Lanka, Bangladesh and Pakistan, covering South Asia. It comes from a Sanskrit word meaning "lion" or "brave person".

Usage

Indian subcontinent
In India, Sinha is used as a surname by the Bengali Kayasthas (also spelt Singha), Haryanvis , Punjabis and the Kayasthas of the Hindi Belt.

In Sri Lanka, the term 'Sinha' (or Siha / Sinhe / Singhe / Singha / Singho) have commonly been used by the Sinhalese (or Sinhala). When it comes to the term 'Sinhala' itself, the first part of the word, 'Sinha' stands for lion while 'la' or 'le' stands for blood, giving the meaning 'Lion's blood'.
The word Simhmam (or Singam / Singham / Singhai / Singai) is the Sri Lankan Tamil derivative. In northeast India, Sinha's held high positions as advisors during the times of the Mughal Empire. In northern and middle part of India as well as southern India Sinhraj/Sinharaj/Sinharaja or Rajasinha is also used, having the meaning Lion/Leo king.

The more common surname Singh in India has the same root. Jayasinghe and other surnames like 'Wijesinghe', 'Weerasingha', 'Edirisinghe', 'Singaiariyan' in Sri Lanka may also share this root.

Brazil
Sinha is also an unrelated name found in Brazil. "Sinhá moça" is a Brazilian colloquialism that may be translated "miss" or "missy".

Notable persons with the surname Sinha
 Tapan Sinha, Indian film director, who worked both in Bengali and Hindi cinema 
 Bidya Sinha Saha Mim, Bangladeshi film actress 
 Manoj Sinha, 2nd Lieutenant Governor of Jammu and Kashmir
 Mala Sinha, Indian film actress
 Kaliprasanna Sinha, Bengali language author, playwright, and philanthropist
 Bikash Sinha, Indian scientist
 Lord Satyendra Prasanna Sinha, first Governor of Bihar and Orissa, first Indian Advocate-General of Bengal, first Indian to become a member of the Viceroy's executive Council and the first Indian to become a member of the British ministry
 Paul Sinha, British quiz player and comedian
 Vidya Sinha, Indian film actress
 Shatrughan Sinha, Indian film actor and politician
 Sonakshi Sinha, Indian film actress
 Shumona Sinha, Indian writer
 Surajit Chandra Sinha, Indian anthropologist
 Anubhav Sinha, Indian film director
 Anugrah Narayan Sinha, Deputy Chief Minister of Bihar
 P. B. Illangasinghe, Sri Lankan notary public, wrote the initial version of Sri Lankan national anthem
 Susanthika Jayasinghe, Sri Lankan athlete who won the Olympic silver medal for the 200m event
 Martin Wickramasinghe, Sri Lankan novelist who authored the greatest Sinhalese novel Viragaya.Viragaya
 Ranil Wickremesinghe, Sri Lankan politician, prime minister of Sri Lanka four times

Places named after Sinha
 Sigiriya, fortress in Sri Lanka; its short name derives from 'Sinha Giriya' meaning "The rocky place of lions"
 Singapore, named from 'Singa Pura' / 'Sinha Pure' which means Lion City in Sanskrit, before 1819

See also
 Singh

References

Surnames
Indian surnames